Chatuge Dam is a flood control and hydroelectric dam on the Hiwassee River in Clay County, in the U.S. state of North Carolina.  The dam is the uppermost of three dams on the river owned and operated by the Tennessee Valley Authority, which built the dam in the early 1940s for flood storage and to provide flow regulation at Hiwassee Dam further downstream.  The dam impounds the  Chatuge Lake, which straddles the North Carolina-Georgia state line.  While originally built solely for flood storage, a generator installed at Chatuge in the 1950s gives the dam a small hydroelectric output.  The dam and associated infrastructure was listed on the National Register of Historic Places in 2017.

Chatuge Dam is named for an 18th-century Cherokee village once situated near the dam site.

Location
Chatuge Lake extends southward for  along the Hiwassee and eastward for roughly  along Shooting Creek, which once emptied into the Hiwassee immediately upstream from the dam site. The dam and the North Carolina section of the reservoir are surrounded by the Nantahala National Forest, and the Georgia section of the reservoir is surrounded by the Chattahoochee National Forest. Hayesville, North Carolina (north of the dam) and Hiawassee, Georgia (to the south) are the nearest communities of note.

Capacity

Water passes Chatuge Dam via the dam's intake tower (connected to the dam by a footbridge), from which a steel conduit carries the water under the dam and empties it downstream.

Background and construction

Various private entities recognized the hydroelectric potential of the Hiwassee in the early 1900s, although plans for dams were typically focused further downstream from the Chatuge site.  After taking control of flood control operations in the valley in the 1930s, the Tennessee Valley Authority built Hiwassee Dam and carried out an extensive survey of the river (the waters of which were a major contributor to flooding in Chattanooga) in which they identified the Chatuge site.  The outbreak of World War II in Europe brought an emergency demand for electricity, mainly to power aluminum production in East Tennessee, and TVA offered to meet this demand by building a series of dams on the Hiwassee and several other Tennessee River tributaries. The Chatuge Dam project (originally called the Hayesville project), along with several other dam projects, was authorized July 16, 1941. Work on the dam began the following day.

TVA kept the dam's design simple and relied on basic building materials (i.e., earth and rock) in order to complete the dam as quickly as possible in hopes of allowing the reservoir to collect the 1941-1942 winter rains. The dam was constructed of impervious earthen fill fortified on both sides by riprap. The spillway was the only major part of the dam that required concrete. Since the reservoir would fill slowly and create mosquito-breeding environments, various measures were taken to prevent malaria outbreaks.

Chatuge Dam was completed and its gates closed on February 12, 1942. The cost of the whole project was just over $9 million. A small generator was installed at Chatuge in 1954.

References

External links

Chatuge Reservoir — official TVA site

Dams on the Hiwassee River
Tennessee Valley Authority dams
Buildings and structures in Clay County, North Carolina
Dams in North Carolina
Hydroelectric power plants in North Carolina
Dams completed in 1942
Energy infrastructure completed in 1942
1942 establishments in North Carolina
Historic districts in North Carolina
National Register of Historic Places in Clay County, North Carolina
Dams on the National Register of Historic Places in North Carolina